Vladimir Anatolyevich Kharin (born 13 September 1964) is a Russian former professional football player.

Club career
Kharin was a promising young footballer when he made 10 appearances for FC Fakel Voronezh in the Soviet Top League during 1985, but he spent the remainder of his playing career in the lower levels of Soviet and Russian football.

Honours
 Russian Second Division top scorer: 1993 (Zone 3, 22 goals), 1999 (Zone Center, 26 goals).

References

External links
 

1964 births
Living people
Soviet footballers
Russian footballers
Association football forwards
FC Fakel Voronezh players
FC Spartak Tambov players
FC Metallurg Lipetsk players
FC Spartak-UGP Anapa players
Soviet Top League players